Anti-Chinese riots may refer to:

In Asia
 1740 Batavia massacre, Dutch East Indies
 1967 anti-Chinese riots in Burma
 13 May incident, 1969, Kuala Lumpur
 Wanpaoshan Incident, 1931, Manchuria
 Banjarmasin riot of May 1997, Indonesia
 May 1998 riots of Indonesia

In North America
 Chinese massacre of 1871, Los Angeles
 San Francisco riot of 1877, San Francisco
 Tacoma riot of 1885
 Rock Springs massacre, 1885, Wyoming
 Vancouver anti-Chinese riots, 1886
 Seattle riot of 1886
 Chinese Massacre Cove, 1887, Oregon
 Pacific Coast race riots of 1907, San Francisco, Bellingham, Vancouver